The mixed doubles tournament of the 2020 European Junior Badminton Championships was held from 2 to 7 November. Fabien Delrue and Juliette Moinard from France clinched this title in the last edition.

Seeds
Seeds were announced on 16 October.

 Lev Barinov / Anastasiia Boiarun (semifinals)
 Aaron Sonnenschein / Leona Michalski (third round)
 Marcus Rindshøj / Mette Werge (third round)
 Matthias Kicklitz / Thuc Phuong Nguyen (champions)
 Pelayo Pinto / Candela Arcos (second round)
 Salvador Franco / Maria de la O Perez (third round)
 Mihajlo Tomic / Andjela Vitman (third round)
 Arthur Boudier / Caroline Racloz (second round)

Draw

Finals

Top half

Section 1

Section 2

Bottom half

Section 3

Section 4

References

External links 
Main Draw

2020 European Junior Badminton Championships